The 1921 Rose Bowl, known at the time as the Tournament East-West Football Game, was a college football bowl game played on January 1, 1921 at Tournament Park in Pasadena, California.  It was the seventh Rose Bowl Game.  The  defeated the Ohio State Buckeyes by a score of 28–0 in the second Big Ten Conference versus Pacific Coast Conference (PCC) meeting in a Rose Bowl, the first being the 1902 Rose Bowl, which featured Michigan and Stanford.  California's victory stood as the only Rose Bowl win for a PCC team over a Big Ten team until the 1953 Rose Bowl.

California finished the season undefeated after handing Ohio State its first loss of the season. The Bears, who outscored their opponents 510–14 for the season, remained undefeated from 1920 until 1924. End Harold Muller was named Player of the Game.  He completed a 53-yard touchdown pass to Brodie Stephens after receiving a toss from Pesky Sprott. Sprott scored two touchdowns after carrying the ball 20 times for 90 yards. It was the last time Ohio State was shut out until the 1993 season.

Ohio State All-American Gaylord Stinchcomb rushed for 82 yards.

Scoring

See also
 2016 Fiesta Bowl (December) - The only other bowl game in which Ohio State was shut out in

References

Rose Bowl
Rose Bowl Game
California Golden Bears football bowl games
Ohio State Buckeyes football bowl games
Rose Bowl
January 1921 sports events
January 1921 events in the United States